Clarenceville may refer to the following places in the United States:
Clarenceville School District, based around the former town of Clarenceville
Clarenceville, Michigan, a former town now absorbed by Farmington Hills
original name of Richmond Hill station (LIRR) 1869–1871

See also
Clarenceville, Quebec